Yancheng Nanyang International Airport  is an airport serving the city of Yancheng in Jiangsu Province, China. It is located in the town of Nanyang,  from the city center.  Commercial flights started in 2000, and international flights started in 2008.

Facilities

Airlines and destinations

Passenger

Cargo

See also
 List of airports in the People's Republic of China

References

External links
 Official website

Airports in Jiangsu
Airports established in 2000
2000 establishments in China
Buildings and structures in Yancheng